The United States Post Office in Norman, Oklahoma, at 207 E. Gray St., was built in 1933 in Classical Revival style.  It was listed on the National Register of Historic Places in 2000 as United States Post Office--Norman.

It was deemed "an outstanding example of a federally-designed Classical Revival style government building".

It later became the Norman Schools Professional Development Center.

References

Post office buildings in Oklahoma
National Register of Historic Places in Cleveland County, Oklahoma
Neoclassical architecture in Oklahoma
Buildings and structures completed in 1933